Alen Maras (born 27 February 1982 in Bjelovar) is a Croatian football player, currently playing as defender for Radnik Križevci.

Club career
In 2013 Maras joined second tier-side NK Inter Zaprešić.

References

External links

 

1982 births
Living people
Sportspeople from Bjelovar
Association football defenders
Association football midfielders
Croatian footballers
Croatia youth international footballers
Croatia under-21 international footballers
NK Varaždin players
NK Osijek players
NK Pomorac 1921 players
NK Zagreb players
NK Bjelovar players
NK Hrvatski Dragovoljac players
NK Slaven Belupo players
NK Inter Zaprešić players
NK Lučko players
Croatian Football League players
First Football League (Croatia) players
Second Football League (Croatia) players